Karl Arnstein (March 24, 1887, Prague – December 12, 1974, Bryan, Ohio) was one of the most important 20th century airship engineers and designers in Germany and the United States of America. He was born in Prague, Bohemia (now the Czech Republic) to Jewish parents. He developed stress analysis methods that have been incorporated into bridges, airships and airplane materials. Before his involvement in airships he was one of the main engineers in building the Swiss Langwieser Viaduct.

In World War I Arnstein worked on improvements to the design of the German Zeppelin airships; see Zeppelin. He was the chief designer of the U.S. Navy airships, USS Akron and USS Macon and was employed by the Goodyear-Zeppelin Corporation in Akron Ohio. He also designed one of the largest airship sheds in the USA for sheltering huge Zeppelins.

References

External links 
 Finding aid for the Karl Arnstein Papers
 Dale Topping, Eric Brothers, When Giants Roamed the Sky - Karl Arnstein and the Rise of Airships from Zeppelin to Goodyear University of Akron Press, 2000

1887 births
1974 deaths
20th-century Czech people
Engineers from Prague
20th-century German engineers
American aerospace engineers
German people of Czech-Jewish descent
German emigrants to the United States
20th-century American engineers
Austro-Hungarian emigrants to Germany